Daiju is both a masculine Japanese given name and a Japanese surname. Notable people with the name include:

, Japanese footballer
, Japanese footballer
, Japanese mixed martial arts fighter and kickboxer
 Daiju Hisateru, Japanese sumo wrestler

Japanese-language surnames
Japanese masculine given names